Ayam rica-rica (Indonesian for chicken rica-rica) is an Indonesian hot and spicy chicken dish. It is made up of chicken that cooked in spicy red and green chili pepper. The origin of this dish is from Minahasan cuisine of North Sulawesi.

Ingredients
The rica-rica bumbu uses much chopped or ground red and green chili peppers, bird's eye chili, shallots, garlic, ginger and a pinch of salt and sugar. Then cleaned chicken meat, either ways can be prepared peeled or unpeeled, are cooked in the rica-rica.

Ayam rica-rica commonly served with steamed rice, fried shallots and fresh cucumber.

See also

Cuisine of Indonesia
Minahasan cuisine
Rica-rica
Balado
Dabu-dabu
Paniki
Sambal
Tinutuan

References

External links
Chicken rica-rica recipe

Manado cuisine
Indonesian chicken dishes